Carlos Roberto Martínez Martínez (born 2 March 1964) is a Mexican politician affiliated with the Party of the Democratic Revolution. As of 2014 he served as Deputy of the LX Legislature of the Mexican Congress representing Oaxaca.

References

1964 births
Living people
People from Oaxaca
Party of the Democratic Revolution politicians
21st-century Mexican politicians
Deputies of the LX Legislature of Mexico
Members of the Chamber of Deputies (Mexico) for Oaxaca